The Island Years may refer to:
 The Island Years (Anthrax album)
 The Island Years (Ultravox album)
 The Island Years (John Cale album)